Islita Airport  is an airport that serves the communities of Punta Islita in the Nandayure Canton of Costa Rica. It is the main access to a series of secluded beaches in southern Nicoya Peninsula.

The airport is owned by a private administrator and currently has four weekly scheduled flights from San José and Nosara.

On December 31, 2017, a plane operated by Nature Air crashed shortly after takeoff from Punta Islita.

Airlines and destinations
There are currently no scheduled operations at the airport.

Charter services
Paradise Air

Passenger Statistics
These data show number of passengers movements into the airport, according to the Directorate General of Civil Aviation of Costa Rica's Statistical Yearbooks.

See also
Transport in Costa Rica
List of airports in Costa Rica

References

External links
OurAirports - Islita Airport
FallingRain - Islita Airport

Airports in Costa Rica
Buildings and structures in Guanacaste Province